This article is about the particular significance of the year 1990 to Wales and its people.

Incumbents

Secretary of State for Wales – Peter Walker (until 4 May); David Hunt
Archbishop of Wales – George Noakes, Bishop of St David's
Archdruid of the National Eisteddfod of Wales
Deudraeth (outgoing)
Ap Llysor (incoming)

Events
26 February - The sea wall at Towyn is breached, resulting in flood damage to 2,800 homes, and the evacuation of a further 2,000.
10 June - Death of John Evans, Britain's oldest man whose age (112 years and 295 days) could be authenticated.
2 August - Highest ever temperature recorded in Wales until 2022, 35.2 °C (95.4 °F) at Hawarden.
27 September - Brymbo Steelworks last tapped.
1 November - Veteran Conservative politician Sir Geoffrey Howe resigns from the government.
December - Privatisation of the former South Wales Electricity Board (SWEB) and Merseyside and North Wales Electricity Board (MANWEB).
21 December - Last underground shift worked at Mardy Colliery.
date unknown - Following a referendum, the Vaynor Community Council in Merthyr Tydfil is abolished, the first time such an action has taken place.

Arts and literature
Commercial sponsorship of the National Eisteddfod of Wales exceeds £1 million for the first time ever.
Griffith R. Williams of Llithfaen, Gwynedd, publishes his autobiography, Cofio canrif, making him the world's oldest author at 102.
Geraint Talfan Davies becomes Controller of BBC Wales.

Awards
National Eisteddfod of Wales (held in Rhymney Valley)
National Eisteddfod of Wales: Chair - Myrddin ap Dafydd, "Gwythiennau"
National Eisteddfod of Wales: Crown - Iwan Llwyd, "Gwreichion"
National Eisteddfod of Wales: Prose Medal - withheld
Gwobr Goffa Daniel Owen - Geraint V. Jones, Yn y Gwaed

New books
John Barnie - The King of Ashes
Carol-Ann Courtney - Morphine and Dolly Mixtures
Rees Davies - Conquest and Domination
Christine Evans - Cometary Phases
David Jones - Rebecca's Children
David H. Williams (Welsh Historian) - Atlas of Cistercian Lands in Wales
Raymond Williams - People of the Black Mountains, vol. 2: The Eggs of the Eagle

Welsh language
Sioned Davies - Pedair Keinc y Mabinogi
Hywel Teifi Edwards - Codi'r Hen Wlad yn ei Hôl
Alun Jones - Plentyn y Bwtias
Dic Jones - Os Hoffech Wybod
R. Gerallt Jones - Cerddi 1955-1989
Gwyneth Lewis - Sonedau Redsa A Cherddi Eraill
Selyf Roberts - Gorwel Agos

Music
Bob Delyn a'r Ebillion - Sgwarnogod Bach Bob
Datblygu - Pyst
Dave Edmunds - Closer to the Flame
Hanner Pei - Locsyn
Siân James - Cysgodion Karma
Jeffrey Lewis - Westminster Mass
Manic Street Preachers - "New Art Riot"
World Party - Goodbye Jumbo

Film
Catherine Zeta-Jones plays her first major film role in 1001 Nights

Welsh-language films
Chwedl Nadolig
Nel
O.M.

Broadcasting

Welsh-language television
The Broadcasting Act 1990 redefines the responsibilities of S4C.
Programmes:
Tydi Bywyd yn Boen

English-language television
Hughezovka (documentary about John Hughes, founder of Donetsk)

Sport
BBC Wales Sports Personality of the Year – Ian Woosnam
Football – Hereford United win the Welsh Cup, but Wrexham, as the top Welsh club, take their place in European competition.
Horse racing – Norton's Coin, trained by Sirrel Griffiths at Nantgaredig, wins the Cheltenham Gold Cup at record odds of 100-1.

Births
10 March - Luke Rowe, cyclist
14 March – Joe Allen, footballer
1 April – Joe Partington, footballer
17 April – Jonathan Brown, footballer
19 August – Laura Deas, skeleton racer
17 September – Jazmin Carlin, swimmer
16 October - Natalie Powell, judoka
23 October - Sian Williams, rugby player
14 November – Casey Thomas, footballer
22 November - Steffan Jones, rugby player
26 December – Aaron Ramsey, footballer

Deaths
4 January – Alwyn Sheppard Fidler, architect, 80
20 January – Trevor Every, cricketer, 80
2 February – Joe Erskine, boxer, 56
12 March – Alf Sherwood, footballer, 66
13 March – Llewellyn Heycock, Baron Heycock, politician, 84
25 March – David Evans, cricketer and umpire, 56
2 April – Peter Jones, radio commentator, 60
4 May – John Ormond, poet and film-maker, 67
9 June – Angus McBean, photographer, 86
10 June – John Evans, world's oldest man at the time, 112
17 June – Menna Gallie, writer
24 June – Sean Hughes, politician of Welsh parentage, 44 (cancer)
7 July – Idwal Davies, rugby player, 74
6 September – Jack Howells, film-maker, 77
29 October – Emrys Roberts, politician, 80
1 November – Jack Petersen, former British heavyweight boxing champion, 79
8 November – Ned Jenkins, Wales international rugby player, 86
13 November – Richard Lewis, operatic tenor, 76
22 November – Cliff Jones, Wales international rugby captain, 76
23 November – Roald Dahl, Cardiff-born children's writer, 74
27 November – Cliff Jones, rugby player, 76
5 December – Eric Whitman, cricketer, 81
23 December – Gwilym Williams, former Archbishop of Wales, 77
24 December 
Don Dearson, footballer, 76
David Gwyn Williams, poet, novelist, translator and academic, 86
date unknown – Cliff Birch, footballer

See also
1990 in Northern Ireland

References

Wales